Jim H. "Big" Thigpen was a college football player.

Auburn University
Thigpen was a prominent guard for Mike Donahue's Auburn Tigers of Auburn University from 1912 to 1915. He was a member of two teams which won a Southern Intercollegiate Athletic Association (SIAA) title in 1913 and 1914. He was a member of an All-time Auburn Tigers football team selected in 1935, as well as coach Donahue's all-time Auburn team.  He was nominated though not selected for an Associated Press All-Time Southeast 1869-1919 era team.

1913
The Atlanta Constitution said he "rated as good as, if not better than, any guard in the south."

1914
In 1914 Auburn featured four All-Southern linemen: Thigpen along with Bull Kearley, Boozer Pitts, and Baby Taylor. The Constitution noted his "smashing brilliant game in the line." One writer claims "Auburn had a lot of great football teams, but there may not have been one greater than the 1913-1914 team."

References

Auburn Tigers football players
American football guards
All-Southern college football players